Galloping Major can refer to:

 The Galloping Major (film), a 1951 British comedy about horse racing
 "The Galloping Major" (song), a popular song originally performed in 1906 by George Henry Bastow and covered by Stanley Kirkby in 1910
 nickname of Hungarian footballer and manager Ferenc Puskás
 nickname of Ronald Ferguson (polo), father of Sarah Ferguson, Duchess of York

See also
 Galloping Major scandal, a 1980s stock exchange scandal